Cychropsis fuscotarsalis is a species of ground beetle in the subfamily of Carabinae. It was described by Deuve in 2003.

References

fuscotarsalis
Beetles described in 2003